Gawsworth Old Rectory is a medieval house in the village of Gawsworth, Cheshire, England. It is known for the rare survival of its "open hall" and the notable 1873 restoration by Richard Norman Shaw, and is recorded in the National Heritage List for England as a designated Grade I listed building. 

The Old Rectory was described as "an exceptionally fine timber-framed house" by Nikolaus Pevsner.

History 
Gawsworth Old Rectory was built as a rectory in c.1470 by the Gawsworth rector George Baguley, for the opposite St. James' Church. Sir Thomas Fytton (Fitton), of nearby Gawsworth Old Hall served as Baguley's patron, and may have helped to finance the rectory's construction. A dedicated inscription to the Fitton family exists built into one of the fireplaces. 

The house was restored first in c.1724 by rector William Hall, and then famously the second time in 1873 by the architect Richard Norman Shaw.

The house served as a rectory to St. James' Church until 1953, when rector John R. Harrison left, and the rectory was moved elsewhere. Gawsworth Old Rectory is now a private house, and not open to the public. It was sold in August 2016 for £3.25 million.

Architecture 

The house is timber-framed, and it retains its hall open to the roof.  Much of the timber framing is close studded and the roof is of plain tiles. Historic England describes the building as "one of the best preserved medium-sized houses of the period in Cheshire, particularly valuable for the survival of the open hall".

See also

Grade I listed buildings in Cheshire East
Listed buildings in Gawsworth

References

External links
Medieval stained glass information from CMVA
Cheshire Photographic Archive
List of Gawsworth rectors
Market sale brochure 

Grade I listed buildings in Cheshire
Houses in Cheshire
Grade I listed houses
Timber framed buildings in Cheshire